The Rock Band Network in the music video game Rock Band 3 supports downloadable songs for the Xbox 360 and PlayStation 3 versions through the consoles' respective online services. The Rock Band Network Store became publicly available on March 4, 2010 for all Xbox 360 players in selected countries (US, Canada, UK, France, Italy, Germany, Spain, Sweden, and Singapore). Rock Band Network songs are available on the PlayStation 3 in five song intervals through their own Rock Band Network Store on April 22, 2010. Rock Band Network songs are exclusive to the Xbox 360 for 30 days, after which a selection of songs are made available on the PlayStation 3. No Rock Band Network 2.0 songs have been released for the Wii in accordance with the discontinued service of Rock Band Network 1.0 for the Wii.

With the release of Rock Band Network 2.0, creators were able to add songs with harmony vocals, standard and pro mode keyboard tracks, and pro drum tracks. Support for pro guitar and bass was not included in RBN 2.0 due to the complexity of authoring such tracks and the small base of pro guitar users/testers.

On February 13, 2013, Harmonix announced that RBN ports to the PlayStation 3 are scheduled to end on April 2, 2013 along with regular DLC releases. Harmonix initially planned to continue to support the backend tools powering the RBN for the Xbox 360; however, support for the RBN officially ended in September 2014 due to numerous technical issues as well as the company devoting resources to other projects.

Pricing 
Prices for Rock Band Network songs are set by the parties involved with authoring and submitting the song, and can be set at either US$1.00, $1.99, or $2.99. The artist retains 30% of this cost, with the remaining 70% of each sale split between Harmonix and Microsoft (although the exact ratios of that distribution are unknown).

Complete list of available songs 

The following songs have been released to the Rock Band Network 2.0. New songs are initially released exclusively for Xbox Live. 30 days after their initial release, songs are eligible to be brought over to the PlayStation 3. Dates listed are the initial release of songs on Xbox Live. Starting March 4, 2010, all downloadable songs are available in the United States, Canada, the United Kingdom, France, Italy, Germany, Spain, Sweden, and Singapore, unless noted. All songs are capable of being changed or removed at any time.

References

External links 
 Official Rock Band Network song list - Additional information for all songs featured in the Rock Band Network.
 Songs // Rock Band

Rock Band Network 2.0
Network 2.0